Pogranichny (masculine), Pogranichnaya (feminine), or Pogranichnoye (neuter) is the name of several inhabited localities in Russia.

Urban localities
Pogranichny, Primorsky Krai, an urban-type settlement in Pogranichny District of Primorsky Krai

Rural localities
Pogranichny, Bagrationovsky District, Kaliningrad Oblast, a settlement in Pogranichny Rural Okrug of Bagrationovsky District of Kaliningrad Oblast
Pogranichny, Krasnoznamensky District, Kaliningrad Oblast, a settlement in Alexeyevsky Rural Okrug of Krasnoznamensky District of Kaliningrad Oblast
Pogranichny, Kirov Oblast, a settlement in Biserovsky Rural Okrug of Afanasyevsky District of Kirov Oblast
Pogranichny, Moscow Oblast, a settlement in Dankovskoye Rural Settlement of Serpukhovsky District of Moscow Oblast
Pogranichny, Saratov Oblast, a settlement in Khvalynsky District of Saratov Oblast
Pogranichny, Zabaykalsky Krai, a settlement in Priargunsky District of Zabaykalsky Krai
Pogranichnoye, Bagrationovsky District, Kaliningrad Oblast, a settlement in Dolgorukovsky Rural Okrug of Bagrationovsky District of Kaliningrad Oblast
Pogranichnoye, Ozyorsky District, Kaliningrad Oblast, a settlement in Novostroyevsky Rural Okrug of Ozyorsky District of Kaliningrad Oblast
Pogranichnoye, Omsk Oblast, a village in Alabotinsky Rural Okrug of Russko-Polyansky District of Omsk Oblast
Pogranichnoye, Penza Oblast, a selo in Pogranichny Selsoviet of Kolyshleysky District of Penza Oblast
Pogranichnoye, Saratov Oblast, a selo in Novouzensky District of Saratov Oblast
Pogranichnoye, Volgograd Oblast, a selo in Novinsky Selsoviet of Zhirnovsky District of Volgograd Oblast